HC Wikov Hronov are a Czech ice hockey club based in Hronov, The Czech Republic. The team competes in the Krajská liga Královéhradeckého kraje, the current playing in third level of play in 2nd Czech Republic Hockey League.

The club was founded in 1937.

Ice hockey clubs established in 1937
Ice hockey teams in the Czech Republic
1937 establishments in Czechoslovakia
Hronov